Armando Velasco (18 January 1918 – 29 September 1999) was an Ecuadorian-born Mexican actor who worked on the Golden Age of Mexican cinema, on films such as The Saint Who Forged a Country (1942), Historia de un gran amor (1942), and You Had To Be a Gypsy (1953).

Selected filmography
In the Times of Don Porfirio (1940)
Miente y serás feliz (1940)
Borrasca humana (1940)
Neither Blood nor Sand (1941)
El rápido de las 9.15 (1941)
The Unknown Policeman (1941)
Historia de un gran amor (1942)
The Saint Who Forged a Country (1942)
Gran Hotel (1944)
Twilight (1945)
Tender Pumpkins (1949)
Midnight (1949)
The Magician (1949)
Confessions of a Taxi Driver (1949)
Love for Love (1950)
La casa chica (1950)
También de dolor se canta (1950)
Immaculate (1950)
Love for Sale (1951)
Road of Hell (1951)
Kill Me Because I'm Dying! (1951)
If I Were a Congressman (1952)
Snow White (1952)
Here Comes Martin Corona (1952)
Penjamo (1953)
Neither Rich nor Poor (1953)
Forbidden Fruit (1953)
Rossana (1953)
A Divorce (1953)
Pepe the Bull (1953)
Eugenia Grandet (1953)
Four Hours Before His Death (1953)
The Criminal Life of Archibaldo de la Cruz (1955)
Corazón salvaje (1956)

References

Bibliography
Trelles Plazaola, Luis. Imágenes cambiantes: descubrimiento, conquista y colonización de la América hispana vista por el cine de ficción y largometraje. La Editorial, UPR, 1996.
Ibarra, Jesús. Los Bracho: tres generaciones de cine mexicano. UNAM, 2006.
Gallardo Saborido, Emilio José. Gitana tenías que ser: las Andalucías imaginadas por las coproducciones fílmicas España-latinoamérica. Centro de Estudios Andaluces, 2010.

External links

1918 births
1999 deaths
Mexican male film actors
20th-century Mexican male actors
People from Quito
Ecuadorian emigrants to Mexico